This is a selection of feature films directed by women directors.

1890s–1940s
 1896 La fée aux choux; director: Alice Guy-Blaché; one of the first narrative (fiction) films
 1911 Bufera d'anime; director:  Elvira Notari
 1912 Algie the Miner; director: Alice Guy-Blaché(uncredited) first western directed by a woman.
 1914 The Merchant of Venice; director: Lois Weber; the first full-length feature film directed by a woman
 1915 The Hypocrites; director: Lois Weber
 1916 Miss Peasant; director: Olga Preobrazhenskaya
 1916 Shoes; director: Lois Weber
 1921 The Blot; director: Lois Weber
 1921 The Love Light; director:  Frances Marion, starring Mary Pickford
 1922 La souriante Madame Beudet (The Smiling Madame Beudet); director: Germaine Dulac; often cited as one of the first feminist feature films
 1923 The Song of Love; director:  Frances Marion, starring Norma Talmadge
 1926 The Adventures of Prince Achmed; director: Lotte Reiniger
 1927 Laila ; director: Aziza Amir
 1927 The Fall of the Romanov Dynasty; director: Esfir Shub
 1928 The Seashell and the Clergyman; director: Germaine Dulac
 1929 The Wild Party; director: Dorothy Arzner
 1930 Sarah and Son; director: Dorothy Arzner
 1030 Anybody's Woman; director: Dorothy Arzner
 1931 Mädchen in Uniform (Girls in uniform); director: Leontine Sagan
 1932 Merrily We Go to Hell; director:  Dorothy Arzner, a Hollywood studio feature film starring Sylvia Sidney
 1933 Christopher Strong; director:  Dorothy Arzner, a Hollywood studio feature film starring Katharine Hepburn
 1931 Honor Among Lovers; director: Dorothy Arzner
 1931 Working Girls; director: Dorothy Arzner
 1934 Nana; director: Dorothy Arzner
 1935 Robin Hood (animated film); director:  Joy Batchelor
 1935 Triumph des Willens (Triumph of the Will); director:  Leni Riefenstahl
 1936 Craig's Wife; director: Dorothy Arzner
 1937 The Bride Wore Red; director: Dorothy Arzner, a Hollywood studio feature film starring Joan Crawford
 1938 Olympia (1938 film); director:  Leni Riefenstahl
 1940 Dance, Girl, Dance; director: Dorothy Arzner
 1943 Meshes of the Afternoon (experimental film); director: Maya Deren; selected by the Library of Congress for preservation in the National Film Registry
 1943 First Comes Courage; director: Dorothy Arzner
 1944 At Land; director: Maya Deren
 1946 Ritual in Transfigured Time; director: Maya Deren
 1949 The Lost People; director: Muriel Box
 1949 Not Wanted; director: Ida Lupino
 1949 Never Fear; director: Ida Lupino
 1949 Gigi; director: Jacqueline Audry.

1950s–1960s
 1950 Outrage; director: Ida Lupino, the first Hollywood studio feature directed by a woman after Dorothy Arzner's films; the story of a rape
 1951 Hard, Fast and Beautiful; director: Ida Lupino
 1951 Olivia; director: Jacqueline Audry
 1951 Streetwalker; director: Matilde Landeta
 1952 The Happy Family; director: Muriel Box
 1953 Street Corner; director Muriel Box
 1953 The Hitch-Hiker; director: Ida Lupino, the first film noir directed by a woman; selected for preservation in the National Film Registry
 1953 The Bigamist; director: Ida Lupino
 1954 Animal Farm; co-director: Joy Batchelor
 1955 La Pointe Courte; director: Agnès Varda
 1955 The Eternal Breasts; director: Kinuyo Tanaka
 1957 Life Flows Quietly By...; director: Binka Zhelyazkova
 1959 Bridges Go-Round; director: Shirley Clarke
 1961 The Connection; director Shirley Clarke
 1961 Cléo de 5 à 7 (Cleo from 5 to 7); director: Agnès Varda
 1962 Les Petits Matins; director: Jacqueline Audry
 1963 The House is Black; director: Forough Farrokhzad
 1963 El Camino; director: Ana Mariscal
 1964 The Cool World; director: Shirley Clarke; the cruel reality of street life in the U.S.
 1964 Älskande par (Loving Couples);  director:  Mai Zetterling
 1965 Le Bonheur; director: Agnes Varda
 1965 The East is Red; director: Wang Ping
 1966 Sedmikrasky (Daisies); director: Věra Chytilová – the story of two young girls who explore the world without taking it too seriously
 1966 Blood Bath; director: Stephanie Rothman
 1966 Wings; director: Larissa Shepitko
 1967 Brief Encounters; director: Kira Muratova
 1967 Portrait of Jason; director Shirley Clarke
 1967 Separation; writer and leading actor Jane Arden
 1968 Rat Life and Diet in North America; director: Joyce Wieland
 1969 La fiancée du pirate (A very curious girl); director: Nelly Kaplan

1970s
 1970 Wanda; director: Barbara Loden; an innovative, influential independent American film
 1971 The Woman's Film; directors: Louise Alaimo, Judy Smith
 1971 The Long Farewell; director: Kira Muratova
 1971 L'aggettivo donna; directors: Ronny Daopolus, Annabella Miscuglio; a radical feminist documentary which analyses the double exploitation of women workers and the isolated situation of housewives and children
 1971 Für Frauen: 1. Kapitel (For Women: Chapter 1); writer and director: Cristina Perincioli – award-winning documentary fiction on a women's strike in Berlin
 1972 Sambizanga; director: Sarah Maldoror – feature film about the liberation movement in Angola
 1972 The Heartbreak Kid; director:  Elaine May
 1972 The Other Side of the Underneath; director Jane Arden
 1972/73 Es kommt darauf an, sie zu verändern; director: Claudia von Alemann – organised women workers discuss the possibilities for change
 1974 Il portiere di notte (The Night Porter); director:  Liliana Cavani
 1974 Vibration (short) ; co-director: Jane Arden
 1974 The Hour of Liberation Has Arrived ; director: Heiny Srour
 1975 Kaddy Bekat – Lettre Paysanne (Letter from My Village); director: Safi Faye
 1975 The Lost Honor of Katharina Blum (Die Verlorene Ehre der Katharina Blum oder: Wie Gewalt entstehen und wohin sie führen kann); directors: Margarethe von Trotta and Volker Schlöndorff
 1975 Hester Street; director: Joan Micklin Silver; Academy Award nomination for Carol Kane as best actress
 1975 The Other Half of the Sky: A China Memoir; directors: Shirley MacLaine, Claudia Weill; Academy Award nomination for Best Documentary Feature
 1975 Anna und Edith; writers: Cristina Perincioli and Cäcilia Rentmeister – first feature film in German TV ZDF on a lesbian relationship
 1975 Seven Beauties; director: Lina Wertmüller
 1976 Jeanne Dielman, 23 quai du Commerce, 1080 Bruxelles; director: Chantal Akerman – the daily life of a housewife
 1975 Catherine & Co.; director: Catherine Breillat
 1976 A Real Young Girl; director: Catherine Breillat
 1976 Pasqualino settebellezze (Seven Beauties); director: Lina Wertmüller; the first time a woman was nominated for an Academy Award for directing a feature film
 1976 Harlan County, USA; director:  Barbara Kopple; Academy Award winner for best documentary feature; selected for preservation in the National Film Registry
 1977 First Love; director:  Joan Darling
 1977 One Sings, the Other Doesn't; director: Agnes Varda
 1977 The Ascent; director: Larissa Shepitko
 1977 News from Home; director: Chantal Akerman
 1977 Les Rendez-vous d'Anna; director: Chantal Akerman
 1978  (Die allseitig reduzierte Persönlichkeit – Redupers); director: Helke Sander
 1978 Girlfriends; director: Claudia Weill; selected for preservation in the National Film Registry
 1978 The Mafu Cage; director:  Karen Arthur
 1978 Mais qu'est ce qu'elles veulent? (But what do they want, after all?) – director: Coline Serreau
 1978 Rabbit Test; director: Joan Rivers
 1978 Die Macht der Männer ist die Geduld der Frauen (The Power of Men is the Patience of Women); writer, director, producer: Cristina Perincioli – (ZDF TV) feature film/documentary fiction on domestic violence
 1978 Getting to Know the Big, Wide World; director: Kira Muratova
 1979 Daughter Rite; director: Michelle Citron – a feminist pseudo-documentary which deconstructs the conventions of Direct Cinema
 1979 Ticket of No Return (Bildnis einer Trinkerin); director: Ulrike Ottinger
 1979 Killing Us Softly; directors: Margaret Lazarus, Renner Wunderlich – the effects of advertising on women
 1979 Deutschland bleiche Mutter (Germany Pale Mother); director: Helma Sanders-Brahms
 1979 My Brilliant Career, starring Judy Davis;  director: Gillian Armstrong
 1979 Anti-Clock; writer and co-director Jane Arden

1980s
 1980 The Life and Times of Rosie the Riveter (documentary); director: Connie Field; selected for preservation in the National Film Registry
 1980 It's My Turn; director: Claudia Weill
 1981 Eight Minutes to Midnight: A Portrait of Dr. Helen Caldicott; director: Mary Benjamin; Academy Award nomination for best feature documentary
 1981 The Decline of Western Civilization; director:  Penelope Spheeris
 1981 36 Chowringhee Lane; director: Aparna Sen
 1981 The German Sisters; director: Margarethe von Trotta
 1982 Fast Times at Ridgemont High; starring Sean Penn; director:  Amy Heckerling
 1983 Among Grey Stones; director: Kira Muratova
 1983 Yentl; director:  Barbra Streisand; The first woman to win a Golden Globe for direction
 1983 The Gold Diggers; director: Sally Potter
 1983 Born in Flames; director: Lizzie Borden
 1983 Le Grain de sable (Grain of Sand); director: Pomme Meffre – the gradual disintegration of a woman (played by Delphine Seyrig)
 1983 Variety; director: Bette Gordon, starring Sandy McLeod
 1985 Smooth Talk; director Joyce Chopra, starring Laura Dern
 1985 Desperately Seeking Susan, starring Madonna; director:  Susan Seidelman
 1985 Vagabond; director: Agnes Varda
 1985 Real Genius; director: Martha Coolidge
 1985 Verführung: die grausame Frau (Seduction: The Cruel Woman); directors: Elfi Mikesch, Monika Treut
 1986 Children of a Lesser God; director:  Randa Haines; Academy Award for Marlee Matlin as best actress
 1987 Near Dark; director: Kathryn Bigelow
 1986 Working Girls; director: Lizzie Borden
 1986 Jumpin' Jack Flash (film); director:  Penny Marshall, starring Whoopi Goldberg
 1988 Big, starring Tom Hanks; director:  Penny Marshall
 1988 Salaam Bombay!; director:  Mira Nair; nominated for an Academy Award as Best Foreign Language Film (India)
 1988 Love, Women, and Flowers (AmorR, Mujeres, y Flores); directors: Marta Rodriguez and Jorge Silva (Colombia)
 1988 Little Dorrit (film); director: Christine Edzard
 1988 Agnes Escapes from the Nursing Home; director: Eileen O'Meara
 1988 Chocolat; director Claire Denis
 1988 Die Jungfrauenmaschine (Virgin Machine); director: Monika Treut
 1988 Kali-Filme (Kalih Films); directors: Birgit Hein and Wilhelm Hein
 1988 36 Fillette; director: Catherine Breillat
 1989 A Dry White Season; director: Euzhan Palcy
 1989 Pet Sematary; director: Mary Lambert
 1989 The Asthenic Syndrome; director: Kira Muratova
 1989 Sweetie; director Jane Campion

1990s
 1990 The Lemon Sisters; director: Joyce Chopra
 1990 Europa, Europa; director:  Agnieszka Holland
 1990 An Angel at My Table; director: Jane Campion
 1990 No Fear, No Die; director: Claire Denis
 1990 Paris is Burning; director: Jennie Livingston
 1991 Thousand Pieces of Gold; director: Nancy Kelly
 1991 Point Break; director Kathryn Bigelow
 1991 Daughters of the Dust; director: Julie Dash; selected for preservation in the National Film Registry
 1991 A Place of Rage; director: Pratibha Parmar
 1991 American Dream; director:  Barbara Kopple; Academy Award winner for best documentary feature
 1991 Proof; director:  Jocelyn Moorhouse;
 1991 Danzón; director: Maria Novaro
 1991 The Prince of Tides; director:  Barbra Streisand; 7 Academy Award nominations including for Barbra Streisand (producer) as Best Picture
 1992 Little Noises; director: Jane Spencer
 1992 Gas Food Lodging; director: Allison Anders
 1992 Orlando; director:  Sally Potter
 1992 History and Memory: For Akiko and Takashige  1992 ; director Rea Tajiri
 1992 A League of Their Own; director: Penny Marshall
 1992 Wayne's World; director: Penelope Spheeris
 1993 Bhaji on the Beach; director: Gurinder Chadha
 1993 Sleepless in Seattle; director:  Nora Ephron
 1994 The Piano; director:  Jane Campion, the second time a woman was nominated for an Academy Award for directing a feature film; Academy Award for Holly Hunter as best actress and Anna Paquin as best supporting actress
 1994 Complaints of a Dutiful Daughter; director: Deborah Hoffman
 1994 Mi Vida Loca; director: Allison Anders
 1994 Black Beauty; director:  Caroline Thompson
 1994 I Can't Sleep; director: Claire Denis
 1994 Little Women; director: Gillian Armstrong
 1994 River of Grass; director: Kelly Reichardt
 1995 Billy Madison; director: Tamra Davis
 1995 Clueless, director: Amy Heckerling
 1995 Coûte que coûte (At all costs); director: Claire Simon – documentary
 1995 Antonia's Line; director: Marleen Gorris; Academy Award for best foreign film, the first time awarded to a female film director.
 1995 Strange Days; director: Kathryn Bigelow
 1996 Fire; director: Deepa Mehta
 1996 Unstrung Heroes; director:  Diane Keaton
 1996 White Men Are Cracking Up; director: Ngozi Onwurah
 1996 The Mirror Has Two Faces; director:  Barbra Streisand; Academy Award nomination for Lauren Bacall as best supporting actress
 1996 The Portrait of a Lady; director Jane Campion
 1996 I Shot Andy Warhol; director: Mary Harron
 1996 Nénette and Boni; director: Claire Denis
 1997 Strawberry Fields; director: Rea Tajiri
 1997 The Peacemaker; director: Mimi Leder
 1997 The Tango Lesson; director: Sally Potter
 1998 That Strange Person, director: Eileen O'Meara
 1998 Free Tibet, director: Sarah Pirozek
 1998 Deep Impact, director: Mimi Leder 
 1998 Half Baked; director: Tamra Davis
 1998 High Art; director: Lisa Cholodenko
 1999 Beau Travail; director: Claire Denis
 1999 Holy Smoke!; director: Jane Campion
 1999 The Green Elephant; director: Svetlana Baskova
 1999 Boys Don't Cry; director:  Kimberly Peirce; Academy Award for Hilary Swank as best actress; nomination for Chloë Sevigny as best supporting actress
 1999 Romance; director: Catherine Breillat
 1999 Titus; director:  Julie Taymor
 1999 The Virgin Suicides; director: Sophia Coppola
 1999 But I'm a Cheerleader; director: Jamie Babbit

2000s
 2000 American Psycho; director: Mary Harron
 2000 Girlfight; director: Karyn Kusama
 2000 The Gleaners and I; director: Agnes Varda
 2000 Loser; director: Amy Heckerling
 2000 The Man Who Cried; director: Sally Potter
 2000 Suspicious River; director: Lynne Stopkewich
 2000 The Weight of Water; director: Kathryn Bigelow
 2000 What Women Want; director: Nancy Meyers
 2001 Brief Crossing; director: Catherine Breillat
 2001 Charlotte Gray; director: Gillian Armstrong
 2001 Fat Girl; director: Catherine Breillat
 2001 La Ciénaga; director: Lucrecia Martel
 2001 Lovely & Amazing; director: Nicole Holofcener
 2001 Lovely Rita; director: Jessica Hausner
 2001 Monsoon Wedding; director: Mira Nair
 2001 Nowhere in Africa; director: Caroline Link
 2001 Rain; director: Christine Jeffs
 2001 Trouble Every Day; director: Claire Denis
 2002 Blue Car; director: Karen Moncrieff
 2002 Divine Secrets of the Ya-Ya Sisterhood; director: Callie Khouri
 2002 Five Bottles of Vodka; director: Svetlana Baskova
 2002 Frida; director: Julie Taymor
 2002 Laurel Canyon; director: Lisa Cholodenko
 2002 Sex Is Comedy; director: Catherine Breillat
 2002 Vendredi soir; director: Claire Denis
 2002 Whale Rider; director: Niki Caro
 2003 At Five in the Afternoon; director: Samira Makhmalbaf
 2003 The Forest for the Trees; director: Maren Ade
 2003 The Head; director: Svetlana Baskova
 2003 In the Cut; director: Jane Campion
 2003 Lost in Translation; director: Sofia Coppola, the third time a woman was nominated for an Academy Award for directing.
 2003 Monster; director: Patty Jenkins
 2003 Something's Gotta Give; director: Nancy Meyers
 2003 Sylvia; director: Christine Jeffs
 2003 Take My Eyes; director: Icíar Bollaín
 2003 Thirteen; director: Catherine Hardwicke
 2003 Virgin; director: Deborah Kampmeier
 2004 Anatomy of Hell; director: Catherine Breillat
 2004 Cavedweller; director: Lisa Cholodenko
 2004 Dear Frankie; director: Shona Auerbach
 2004 D.E.B.S.; director: Angela Robinson
 2004 Down to the Bone; director: Debra Granik
 2004 Goddess: How I fell in Love; director: Renata Litvinova
 2004 The Holy Girl; director: Lucrecia Martel
 2004 Hotel; director: Jessica Hausner
 2004 The Intruder; director: Claire Denis
 2004 Mars; director: Anna Melikyan
 2004 The Prince & Me; director: Martha Coolidge
 2004 Somersault; director: Cate Shortland
 2004 Speak; director: Jessica Sharzer
 2004 Vanity Fair; director: Mira Nair
 2004 The Woodsman; director: Nicole Kassell
 2004 Yes; director: Sally Potter
 2005 Æon Flux; director: Karyn Kusama
 2005 The Ballad of Jack and Rose; director: Rebecca Miller
 2005 Born into Brothels; director: Zana Briski co-directed with Ross Kauffman
 2005 Close to Home, directors: Dalia Hager and Vidi Bilu
 2005 Herbie: Fully Loaded; director: Angela Robinson
 2005 Look Both Ways; director: Sarah Watt
 2005 Lords of Dogtown; director: Catherine Hardwicke
 2005 North Country; director: Niki Caro
 2005 The Notorious Bettie Page; director: Mary Harron
 2005 Sisters of '77; director: Cynthia Salzman Mondell co-directed with Allen Mondell
 2006 Away from Her; director: Sarah Polley
 2006 Day Night Day Night; director: Julia Loktev
 2006 The Dead Girl; director: Karen Moncrieff
 2006 Diggers; director: Katherine Dieckmann
 2006 Friends with Money; director: Nicole Holofcener
 2006 The Holiday; director: Nancy Meyers
 2006 Marie Antoinette; director: Sofia Coppola
 2006 Material Girls; director: Martha Coolidge
 2006 Old Joy; director: Kelly Reichardt
 2006 Piter FM; director: Oksana Bychkova
 2006 Red Road; director: Andrea Arnold
 2006 Sherrybaby; director: Laurie Collyer
 2006 Stick It; director: Jessica Bendinger
 2007 Across the Universe; director: Julie Taymor
 2007 All Is Forgiven; director: Mia Hansen-Løve
 2007 Death Defying Acts; director: Gillian Armstrong
 2007 Hounddog; director: Deborah Kampmeier
 2007 I Could Never Be Your Woman; director: Amy Heckerling
 2007 The Last Mistress; director: Catherine Breillat
 2007 Mermaid; director: Anna Melikyan
 2007 Never Forever; director: Gina Kim
 2007 The Savages; director: Tamara Jenkins
 2007 Things We Lost in the Fire; director: Susanne Bier
 2007 Waitress; director: Adrienne Shelly
 2007 Water Lilies; director: Céline Sciamma
 2008 35 Shots of Rum; director: Claire Denis
 2008 The Beaches of Agnes; director: Agnes Varda
 2008 Everybody Dies but Me; director: Valeriya Gai Germanika
 2008 Frozen River; director: Courtney Hunt
 2008 The Headless Woman; director: Lucrecia Martel
 2008 The Hurt Locker; director: Kathryn Bigelow, the first woman to win an Academy Award for directing.
 2008 Stop-Loss; director: Kimberly Peirce
 2008 Sunshine Cleaning; director: Christine Jeffs
 2008 Surveillance; director: Jennifer Lynch
 2008 Twilight; director: Catherine Hardwicke
 2008 Wendy and Lucy; director: Kelly Reichardt
 2009 Amelia; director: Mira Nair
 2009 An Education; director: Lone Scherfig
 2009 Bluebeard; director: Catherine Breillat
 2009 Bright Star; director: Jane Campion
 2009 Cold Souls; director: Sophie Barthes
 2009 Everyone Else; director: Maren Ade
 2009 Father of My Children; director: Mia Hansen-Løve
 2009 Fish Tank; director: Andrea Arnold
 2009 It's Complicated; director: Nancy Meyers
 2009 Jennifer's Body; director: Karyn Kusama
 2009 Lourdes; director: Jessica Hausner
 2009 Motherhood; director: Katherine Dieckmann
 2009 My Year Without Sex; director: Sarah Watt
 2009 The Private Lives of Pippa Lee; director: Rebecca Miller
 2009 Rage; director: Sally Potter
 2009 White Material; director: Claire Denis

2010s
 2010 Denizen; director: J.A. Steel
 2010 The Freebie; director: Katie Aselton
 2010 The High Cost of Living; director: Deborah Chow
 2010 I Will Follow; director: Ava DuVernay
 2010 The Kids Are All Right; director: Lisa Cholodenko
 2010 Meek's Cutoff; director; Kelly Reichardt
 2010 Nanny McPhee and the Big Bang; director: Susanna White
 2010 Night Catches Us; director: Tanya Hamilton
 2010 Please Give; director: Nicole Holofcener
 2010 The Runaways; director: Floria Sigismondi
 2010 Somewhere; director: Sofia Coppola
 2010 The Tempest; director: Julie Taymor
 2010 The Whistleblower; director: Larysa Kondracki
 2010 Winter's Bone; director: Debra Granik
 2011 A Little Bit of Heaven; director: Nicole Kassell
 2011 Goodbye First Love; director Mia Hansen-Løve
 2011 Hysteria; director: Tanya Wexler
 2011 In the Land of Blood and Honey; director: Angelina Jolie
 2011 The Loneliest Planet; director: Julia Loktev
 2011 The Moth Diaries; director: Mary Harron
 2011 The Off Hours; director: Megan Griffiths
 2011 One Day; director: Lone Scherfig
 2011 Pariah; director: Dee Rees
 2011 Red Riding Hood; director: Catherine Hardwicke
 2011 Return; director: Liza Johnson
 2011 Sengadal; director: Leena Manimekalai
 2011 Take This Waltz; director: Sarah Polley
 2011 Tomboy; director: Céline Sciamma
 2011 Two Days; director: Avdotya Smirnova
 2011 We Need to Talk About Kevin; director: Lynne Ramsay
 2011 Wuthering Heights; director: Andrea Arnold
 2011 Yelling to the Sky; director: Victoria Mahoney
 2011 Your Sister's Sister; director: Lynn Shelton
 2012 Black Rock; director: Katie Aselton
 2012 Breaking the Girls; director: Jamie Babbit
 2012 Chained; director: Jennifer Lynch
 2012 Eden; director: Megan Griffiths
 2012 Ginger & Rosa; director: Sally Potter
 2012 Kiss of the Damned; director: Alexandra Cassavetes
 2012 Middle of Nowhere; director: Ava DuVernay
 2012 The Reluctant Fundamentalist; director: Mira Nair
 2012 Saving Face; director: Sharmeen Obaid-Chinoy
 2012 Seeking a Friend for the End of the World; director: Lorene Scafaria
 2012 Stories We Tell; director: Sarah Polley
 2012 Vamps; director: Amy Heckerling
 2012 Wadjda; director: Haifaa al-Mansour first film to be shot entirely in Saudi Arabia
 2012 Zero Dark Thirty; director: Kathryn Bigelow
 2013 A Teacher; director: Hannah Fidell
 2013 Abuse of Weakness; director: Catherine Breillat
 2013 Bastards; director: Claire Denis
 2013 The Bling Ring; director: Sofia Coppola
 2013 Butter on the Latch; director: Josephine Decker
 2013 Carrie; director Kimberly Peirce
 2013 Concussion; director: Stacie Passon
 2013 Desert Runners; director: Jennifer Steinman
 2013 Enough Said; director: Nicole Holofcener
 2013 Final Recipe; director: Gina Kim
 2013 Frozen, director: Jennifer Lee co-directed with Chris Buck
 2013 Hateship, Loveship; director: Liza Johnson
 2013 It Felt Like Love; director: Eliza Hittman
 2013 Lucky Them; director: Megan Griffiths
 2013 Night Moves; director: Kelly Reichardt
 2013 Palo Alto; director: Gia Coppola
 2013 Plush; director: Catherine Hardwicke
 2013 The Pretty One; director: Jenée LaMarque
 2013 Sunlight Jr.; director: Laurie Collyer
 2013 The To Do List; director: Maggie Carey
 2013 Touchy Feely; director: Lynn Shelton
 2014 A Girl Walks Home Alone at Night: director: Ana Lily Amirpour
 2014 Amour Fou: director: Jessica Hausner
 2014 Appropriate Behavior; director: Desiree Akhavan
 2014 The Babadook; director: Jennifer Kent
 2014 Dukhtar; director: Afia Nathaniel
 2014 Eden; director; Mia Hansen-Løve
 2014 Girlhood; director: Celine Sciamma
 2014 Honeymoon; director: Leigh Janiak
 2014 I Believe in Unicorns; director: Leah Meyerhoff
 2014 Kelly & Cal; director: Jen McGowan
 2014 Laggies; director: Lynn Shelton
 2014 Madame Bovary; director: Sophie Barthes
 2014 Miss Meadows; director: Karen Leigh Hopkins
 2014 Obvious Child; director: Gillian Robespierre
 2014 The Riot Club; director: Lone Scherfig
 2014 Selma; director: Ava DuVernay
 2014 The Sleepwalker; director: Mona Fastvold 
 2014 Thou Wast Mild and Lovely director: Josephine Decker
 2014 Unbroken; director: Angelina Jolie
 2014 The Voices; director: Marjane Satrapi
 2014 Welcome to Me; director: Shira Piven
 2014 The Wonders: director: Alice Rohrwacher
 2015 3 Bahadur; director: Sharmeen Obaid-Chinoy
 2015 6 Years; director: Hannah Fidell
 2015 The Adderall Diaries; director: Pamela Romanowsky
 2015 Addicted to Fresno; director: Jamie Babbit
 2015 Advantageous; director: Jennifer Phang
 2015 Bare; director: Natalia Leite
 2015 By the Sea; director: Angelina Jolie
 2015 The Diary of a Teenage Girl; director: Marielle Heller
 2015 The Dressmaker; director: Jocelyn Moorhouse
 2015 Good Morning Karachi; director: Sabiha Sumar
 2015 The Intern; director: Nancy Meyers
 2015 Into the Forest; director: Patricia Rozema
 2015 The Invitation; director: Karyn Kusama
 2015 Maggie's Plan; director: Rebecca Miller
 2015 The Meddler; director: Lorene Scafaria
 2015 Miss You Already; director: Catherine Hardwicke
 2015 Mustang; director: Deniz Gamze Ergüven
 2015 Songs My Brothers Taught Me; director: Chloé Zhao
 2015 Suffragette; director: Sarah Gavron
 2016 American Honey, director: Andrea Arnold
 2016 Always Shine; director: Sophia Takal
 2016 The Bad Batch; director: Ana Lily Amirpour
 2016 Carrie Pilby; director: Susan Johnson
 2016 Certain Women; director: Kelly Reichardt
 2016 The Edge of Seventeen; director: Kelly Fremon Craig
 2016 Elvis & Nixon; director: Liza Johnson
 2016 The Love Witch; director: Anna Biller
 2016 The Night Stalker; director: Megan Griffiths
 2016 Our Kind of Traitor; director: Susanna White
 2016 Prevenge; director: Alice Lowe
 2016 Queen of Katwe; director: Mira Nair
 2016 Raw; director: Julia Ducournau
 2016 Sami Blood; director: Amanda Kernell
 2016 Strange Weather; director: Katherine Dieckmann
 2016 Their Finest; director: Lone Scherfig
 2016 Things to Come; director: Mia Hansen-Love
 2016 Toni Erdmann; director: Maren Ade
 2016 White Girl; director: Elizabeth Wood
 2016 The Whole Truth; director: Courtney Hunt
 2016 Women Who Kill; director: Ingrid Jungermann
 2017 Band Aid; director: Zoe Lister-Jones
 2017 Beach Rats; director: Eliza Hittman
 2017 The Beguiled; director: Sofia Coppola
 2017 Berlin Syndrome; director: Cate Shortland
 2017 Detroit; director: Kathryn Bigelow
 2017 The Feels; director Jenée LaMarque
 2017 First they Killed My Father; director: Angelina Jolie
 2017 The Institute; director: Pamela Romanowsky co-directed with James Franco
 2017 The Keeping Hours; director: Karen Moncrieff
 2017 Lady Bird; director: Greta Gerwig
 2017 Landline; director: Gillian Robespierre
 2017 Lemon; director: Janicza Bravo
 2017 Let the Sunshine In; director: Claire Denis
 2017 M.F.A.; director: Natalia Leite
 2017 Maya Dardel; director: Magdalena Zyzak
 2017 Novitiate; director: Maggie Betts
 2017 Outside In; director: Lynn Shelton
 2017 The Party; director: Sally Potter
 2017 Professor Marston and the Wonder Women; director: Angela Robinson
 2017 Revenge; director: Coralie Fargeat
 2017 The Rider; director: Chloé Zhao
 2017 Rough Night; director: Lucia Aniello
 2017 Woman Walks Ahead; director: Susanna White
 2017 Wonder Woman; director: Patty Jenkins
 2017 You Were Never Really Here; director: Lynne Ramsay
 2017 The Zookeeper's Wife; director: Niki Caro
 2018 A Wrinkle in Time; director: Ava DuVernay
 2018 All About Nina; director: Eva Vives
 2018 Blockers; director: Kay Cannon
 2018 Can You Ever Forgive Me?; director: Marielle Heller
 2018 Charlie Says; director: Mary Harron
 2018 Dead Pigs; director: Cathy Yan
 2018 Destroyer; director: Karyn Kusama
 2018 First Match; director: Olivia Newman
 2018 Furlough; director: Laurie Collyer
 2018 Happy as Lazzaro; director: Alice Rohrwacher
 2018 High Life; director: Claire Denis
 2018 The Land of Steady Habits; director: Nicole Holofcener
 2018 Leave No Trace; director: Debra Granik
 2018 Little Woods; director: Nia DaCosta
 2018 The Long Dumb Road; director: Hannah Fidell
 2018 M; director: Anna Eriksson
 2018 Madeline's Madeline; director: Josephine Decker
 2018 The Man Who Surprised Everyone; director Natasha Merkulova
 2018 Mary Queen of Scots; director: Josie Rourke
 2018 Maya; director: Mia Hansen-Løve
 2018 The Miseducation of Cameron Post; director: Desiree Akhavan
 2018 Mouthpiece; director: Patricia Rozema
 2018 Nancy; director: Christina Choe
 2018 Never Goin' Back; director: Augustine Frizzell
 2018 The New Romantic; director: Carly Stone
 2018 Night Comes On; director: Jordana Spiro
 2018 The Nightingale; director: Jennifer Kent
 2018 Ophelia; director: Claire McCarthy
 2018 Private Life; director: Tamara Jenkins
 2018 Rust Creek; director: Jen McGowan
 2018 Sadie; director: Megan Griffiths
 2018 The Spy Who Dumped Me; director: Susanna Fogel
 2018 State Like Sleep; director: Meredith Danluck
 2018 Story of One Appointment; director: Avdotya Smirnova
 2018 We Have Always Lived in the Castle; director: Stacie Passon
 2018 What They Had; director: Elizabeth Chomko
 2018 The Wind; director: Emma Tammi
 2019 A Beautiful Day in the Neighborhood; director: Marielle Heller
 2019 Atlantics; director: Mati Diop
 2019 Babyteeth; director: Shannon Murphy
 2019 Black Conflux; director: Nicole Dorsey
 2019 Body at Brighton Rock; director: Roxanne Benjamin
 2019 Buffaloed; director: Tanya Wexler
 2019 Captain Marvel; director: Anna Boden co-directed with Ryan Fleck
 2019 Clemency; director: Chinonye Chukwu
 2019 The Farewell; director: Lulu Wang
 2019 First Cow; director: Kelly Reichardt
 2019 Frozen II; director: Jennifer Lee co-directed with Chris Buck
 2019 Harriet; director: Kasi Lemmons
 2019 Hustlers; director: Lorene Scafaria
 2019 Instinct; director: Halina Reijn
 2019 Judy and Punch; director: Mirrah Foulkes
 2019 The Kindness of Strangers; director: Lone Scherfig
 2019 Little Joe; director: Jessica Hausner
 2019 Little Women; director: Greta Gerwig
 2019 Miss Bala; director: Catherine Hardwicke
 2019 The Other Lamb; director: Małgorzata Szumowska
 2019 Paradise Hills; director: Alice Waddington
 2019 Portrait of a Lady on Fire; director: Celine Sciamma
 2019 Queen & Slim; director: Melina Matsoukas
 2019 Radioactive; director: Marjane Satrapi
 2019 Rocks; director: Sarah Gavron
 2019 Saint Maud; director: Rose Glass
 2019 The Souvenir; director: Joanna Hogg
 2019 Sword of Trust; director: Lynn Shelton
 2019 To the Stars; director: Martha Stephens
 2019 The Wall of Mexico; director: Magdalena Zyzak
 2019 When I'm a Moth; director: Magdalena Zyzak

2020s
 2020 Amulet; director: Romola Garai
 2020 Birds of Prey; director: Cathy Yan
 2020 The Broken Hearts Gallery; director: Natalie Krinsky
 2020 Charter; director: Amanda Kernell
 2020 The Craft: Legacy; director: Zoe Lister-Jones
 2020 The Glorias; director: Julie Taymor
 2020 The High Note; director: Nisha Ganatra
 2020 Holler; director: Nicole Riegel
 2020 I'm Your Woman; director: Julia Hart
 2020 Kajillionaire; director: Miranda July
 2020 Lorelei; director: Sabrina Doyle
 2020 Mainstream; director: Gia Coppola
 2020 Misbehaviour; director: Philippa Lowthorpe
 2020 Never Rarely Sometimes Always; director: Eliza Hittman
 2020 Nomadland; director: Chloé Zhao
 2020 Promising Young Woman; director: Emerald Fennell
 2020 Relic; director: Natalie Erika James
 2020 The Roads Not Taken; director: Sally Potter
 2020 She Dies Tomorrow; director: Amy Seimetz
 2020 Shirley; director: Josephine Decker
 2020 Shiva Baby; director: Emma Seligman
 2020 The Three; director: Anna Melikian
 2020 Wonder Woman 1984; director: Patty Jenkins
 2020 The World to Come; director: Mona Fastvold
 2021 Bergman Island; director: Mia Hansen-Løve
 2021 Black Widow; director: Cate Shortland
 2021 Candyman; director: Nia DaCosta
 2021 Captain Volkonogov Escaped; director: Natasha Merkulova
 2021 Censor; director: Prano Bailey-Bond
 2021 CODA; director: Siân Heder
 2021 The Fallout; director: Megan Park
 2021 Gerda; director: Natalya Kudryashova
 2021 Happening; director: Audrey Diwan
 2021 I'm Your Man; director: Maria Schrader
 2021 Mayday; director: Karen Cinorre
 2021 Mona Lisa and the Blood Moon; director: Ana Lily Amirpour
 2021 The North Wind; director Renata Litvinova
 2021 The Novice; director: Lauren Hadaway
 2021 Petite Maman; director: Celine Sciamma
 2021 Pleasure; director Ninja Thyberg
 2021 The Power of the Dog; director: Jane Campion
 2021 Quarantine; director: Diana Ringo
 2021 She Will; director: Charlotte Colbert
 2021 Titane; director: Julia Ducournau
 2021 Together Together; director: Nikole Beckwith
 2021 Violet; director: Justine Bateman
 2021 Wolf; director: Nathalie Biancheri
 2021 Yuni; director: Kamila Andini
 2021 Zola; director: Janicza Bravo
 2022 Aftersun; director: Charlotte Wells
 2022 Alice, Darling; director: Mary Nighy
 2022 Amanda; director: Carolina Cavalli
 2022 Aristotle and Dante Discover the Secrets of the Universe; director: Aitch Alberto
 2022 Bodies Bodies Bodies; director: Halina Reijn
 2022 Both Sides of the Blade; director: Claire Denis
 2022 Dalíland; director: Mary Harron
 2022 Emily; director: Frances O'Connor
 2022 Fresh; director: Mimi Cave
 2022 Girl Picture; director: Alli Haapasalo
 2022 Good Luck to You, Leo Grande; director: Sophie Hyde
 2022 Hatching; director: Hanna Bergholm
 2022 Mack & Rita; director: Katie Aselton
 2022 Piggy; director: Carlota Pereda
 2022 She Said; director: Maria Schrader
 2022 Sissy; director: Hannah Barlow co-directed with Kane Senes
 2022 Stars at Noon; director: Claire Denis
 2022 Till; director: Chinonye Chukwu
 2022 Umma; director: Iris K. Shim
 2022 Watcher; director: Chloe Okuno
 2022 Where the Crawdads Sing; director: Olivia Newman
 2022 Women Talking; director: Sarah Polley
 2023 Mafia Mamma; director: Catherine Hardwicke
 2023 There's Something Wrong with the Children; director: Roxanne Benjamin
 2023 Unseen; director: Yoko Okumura
 TBA Barbie; director: Greta Gerwig

References

Lists of films
Women in film
Women-related lists